Maske: Thaery is a science fiction novel by American writer Jack Vance, set in his Gaean Reach milieu, which was first published as a paperback by Berkley Books, the science-fiction imprint of Putnam, in 1976. It is about a young man, Jubal Droad, from the Droad caste on the planet Maske, who has a chance encounter with an arrogant nobleman, Ramus Ymph, who almost ends up causing Jubal's death. As Jubal tries to seek a job from the powerful noble Nai the Hever, Jubal finds himself involved with Thaery's intelligence agency. Jubal's desire for revenge overlaps with the intelligence agency's interest in Ramus Ymph, leading Jubal on a planet-hopping adventure to track down his nemesis.

Maske: Thaery marks the beginning of the period when Vance's novels were published exclusively straight to paperback, whereas prior to this the majority had first appeared in science fiction magazines, the last such examples being Durdane trilogy, serialized in The Magazine of Fantasy & Science Fiction from 1971 to 1973, The Gray Prince, serialized in Amazing Science Fiction in 1974, and Marune: Alastor 933, also serialized in Amazing Science Fiction in 1974. The twofold title of Maske: Thaery, with its separating colon, would suggest that it was originally intended to be part of a serial, similar to the Alastor novels (Trullion: Alastor 2262, Marune: Alastor 933, and Wyst: Alastor 1716), although no further volumes were written: instead, Vance completed his Demon Princes series, after a hiatus of more than a decade, with The Face (1979) and The Book of Dreams (1981), before embarking on his Lyonesse trilogy (1983–89).

Maske: Thaery continues Vance's interest in richly textured, strongly xenological settings, in which an outsider protagonist comes into conflict with a bewilderingly complex social hierarchy, other examples being Emphyrio (1969) and the Durdane trilogy. Like many of Vance's novels of the 1960s and '70s, the narrative of Maske: Thaery might be described as a bildungsroman.

Plot summary
Long ago, the isolated planet Maske was settled by a religious group. They seized a section of the planet from earlier colonists (the Djan), and named it Thaery. The ship carrying a dissident faction was attacked and crashed across the Long Ocean which encircles the planet. The survivors eventually reemerged as the Waels of Wellas. The members of another faction were exiled to the stony peninsula of Glentlin, where they became the Glints. The Glints became notorious bandits, but were eventually subjugated. However, they are still looked down upon as coarse and belligerent. Some Glints took to sailing, and as "Sea Nationals", claimed sovereignty over the ocean. The orthodox settlers divided Thaery into twelve prosperous cantons. Seeking to maintain their religious purity, the Thariots prohibited all travel to other worlds.

Jubal Droad, a young Glint man, goes on Yallow, a rite of passage into adulthood, traditionally spent wandering the land and tending the countryside by doing public works. He recruits three Djan and spends several weeks repairing a trail by hauling rocks. One day, an arrogant Thariot leading a group of soldiers ignores Jubal's urgent warning to not use the still unfinished trail. He and his Djan escort use the path, causing it to collapse and seriously injure Jubal.

When he recovers, his uncle Vaidro gives him a letter of introduction to Nai the Hever, one of the most powerful men of Thaery and urges his young relative to seek employment. He arrives in the coastal city of Wysrod and encounters Nai's elegant adult daughter Mieltrude and her beautiful friend Sune Mircea. He accompanies them to the examination of Ramus Ymph for a vacancy for the high office of Servant. Jubal recognizes his nemesis. During a recess, he informs Nai the Hever, the senior Servant, of the incident on the trail and Jubal's investigation of Ymph's activities that result in Ramus being rejected. Ramus, as Jubal has deduced, has secretly taken a spaceship off-world, breaking the laws of Thaery.

On the strength of Vaidro's letter, Nai the Hever offers Jubal a seemingly lowly position as Sanitary Inspector in unit D3. Jubal reluctantly accepts and learns, during his training, that D3 is a cover story for the intelligence service. He has unwittingly become a secret agent. Nai the Hever is in fact the head of Thaery's intelligence service, and Jubal's uncle Vaidro worked with him before he retired.

Ramus Ymph seeks revenge by inducing Mieltrude, his fiancée, into signing a warrant to subject Jubal to severe torture, including bone breaking. Jubal escapes from the thugs with the assistance of Shrack, a Sea National acquaintance and ship captain, and procures a warrant against Mieltrude. After a confrontation with Nai the Hever, Mieltrude's warrant is canceled.

Jubal's first assignment is to discover what Ramus is plotting. He follows Ramus to the tourist world Eiselbar and learns that he is posing as a rug salesman and trying to raise enough money to purchase a space yacht.

Back on Maske, Jubal is called away by a family crisis. Cadmus off-Droad, Jubal's illegitimate brother, has murdered Trewe, their older brother and head of the clan, asserting that he had been robbed of his rightful place. The clan gathers and brings Cadmus down in fierce fighting. However, Cadmus's masked chief accomplice escapes, and Jubal is certain that it is Ramus. Without proof though, Nai the Hever is unwilling to antagonize the powerful Ymph clan. In fact, Jubal infers that he has become an embarrassment to his superior.

Nonetheless, Jubal investigates on his own and finds that Ramus is sailing across the ocean to meet with the Waels, a people who live in a barren, unproductive land and who have developed a deep spiritual connection with trees. Nai is uninterested, so Jubal is forced to use his own initiative. He pursues Ramus in Shrack's ship. Jubal takes Mieltrude into custody, using his warrant, and brings her along. As the voyage progresses, their mutual disdain for each other begins to weaken. Mieltrude informs Jubal that her engagement to Ramus was purely in order to aid her father's investigation of Ramus. Ramus's mistress, Sune, had forged Mieltrude's signature to the warrant against Jubal.

Jubal finds Ramus negotiating with the tree-worshipping Waels for the use of their land in exchange for much-needed food and other resources. The Minie, leader of the Waels, allows a disguised Jubal to question Ramus. Jubal gets his evasive enemy to finally admit that he wants to construct large tourist resorts, run by his Eiselbar associates, in the Waels land. (Ramus had also wanted to lease Droad land for the same purpose, hence his support for Cadmus.) The Waels are greatly disturbed by the revelation and reject his proposal.

They do something to Ramus which leaves him mute and strangely subdued, and insist that Shrack and Jubal take him back with them. During the return voyage, Ramus sprouts bark and leaves, to the awestruck horror of the others. When they reach Wysrod, Ramus runs off the ship, plants his feet in the soil, raises his arms, and to all intents and purposes, becomes a tree.

Afterwards, Nai the Hever asks his daughter her opinion of Jubal. She admits that he is not unpleasant, for a Glint.

Characters
Jubal Droad, a determined young Glint man
Trewe Droad, Jubal's older brother and head of the Droad clan
Vaidro Droad, Jubal's uncle, a retired intelligence agent from D3
Ramus Ymph, an arrogant and ambitious Thariot nobleman
Nai the Hever, a wealthy, middle-aged Thariot of high status, he is a Servant (the top tier of leaders) and is secretly the head of the D3 intelligence agency
Eyvant Dasduke, Nai the Hever's chief subordinate in the D3 intelligence agency (under cover of being a hotel inspector)
Mieltrude, Nai the Hever's haughty daughter
Sune Mircea, Mieltrude's less decorous friend
Shrack, a Sea National and ship captain of good character
the Minie, the wise leader of the Waels people
Cadmus off-Droad, illegitimate brother of Jubal and Trewe

References

External links

1976 American novels
Novels by Jack Vance
Novels set on fictional planets
American science fiction novels
1976 science fiction novels
American spy novels
 Novels about revenge